The Mississippi Valley Trust Company Building is a historic building in St. Louis, Missouri, USA.

Location
The location is at 401 Pine Street in Downtown St. Louis, Missouri.

History
The two-story building was completed in 1896. It was designed by architectural firm Eames & Young in the Beaux-Arts architectural style.

It was home to the Mississippi Valley Trust Company, a local bank which "financed transportation and communication networks in the St. Louis region, and was a supporter of the St. Louis World's Fair". The bank was later acquired by the Mercantile Bancorporation, which was in turn acquired by the Firstar Corporation, and eventually U.S. Bancorp. Later, the building was home to a restaurant. It is now home to TechArtista, a St. Louis-based coworking space with multiple locations in the city. It is also home to a coffee shop and cocktail bar called Trust, an homage to the building's origins.

Architectural significance
It has been listed on the National Register of Historic Places since May 25, 2001. Additionally, it has been designated as a city landmark by the City of St. Louis, Missouri. Furthermore, it is the third location on the Let's Roam Saint Louis Architectural Scavenger Hunt.

References

Commercial buildings completed in 1896
Bank buildings on the National Register of Historic Places in Missouri
Beaux-Arts architecture in Missouri
National Register of Historic Places in St. Louis
Downtown St. Louis
Buildings and structures in St. Louis
1896 establishments in Missouri